Sinocyclocheilus tileihornes is a species of freshwater  ray-finned fish in the genus Sinocyclocheilus. It is indigenous to Asia and, like most fish of the Sinocyclocheilus genus, lives primarily in or around caves.

References 

tileihornes
Fish described in 2003